Coven (pronounced ) is a 1997 American short independent horror film written, directed by and starring Mark Borchardt. The making of the film was chronicled in the 1999 documentary film American Movie. Coven was shot in black-and-white with local talent around Milwaukee, Wisconsin.

Plot summary
Mike is a writer struggling with a lack of artistic productivity. To deal with the pressures he feels from within and without, he escalates his abuse of alcohol. One day, when faced with overwhelming deadlines, he takes a large quantity of pills with alcohol, resulting in an overdose and hospitalization. When Steve takes notice of Mike's increasing volatility and isolation, he confronts the defensive writer, showing genuine concern for his friend's self-destructive behavior in the process. It is suggested, by the lack of others at the intervention, that Steve may be the only friend Mike has left. Steve asks Mike to join him at a support group with which he is affiliated and, after gaining some perspective, Mike agrees. Soon, however, Mike comes to realize that the group has a deeper occult agenda and uses extreme, sometimes supernatural, tactics to "help" new members remain clean and sober.

Cast
 Mark Borchardt as Mike
 Tom Schimmels as Steve
 Miriam Frost as Sharon
 Robert Richard Jorge as Goodman
 Sherrie Beaupre as Daesa

Jack Bennett, Mark Nadolski, Scott Berendt, Barbara Zanger, Donna McMaster, Mike Schank, Cindy Snyder, Nancy Williams, and Wayne Bubois play the support group members.

Sales and distribution
Coven was largely funded by Mark's uncle Bill Borchardt's savings with the understanding that Mark had to sell 3,000 copies in order for Bill to make his money back. However, Bill died shortly after the release of Coven. Bill, along with Mark and an assortment of friends and neighbors, star in the film. The movie was sold through the (now defunct) website www.northwestproductions.com. By 2004, Mark had sold 5,100 copies of Coven at $14.95 each.

Critical reception and legacy

On the review aggregator website Rotten Tomatoes, Coven has an approval rating of 43% based on seven reviews, with an average rating of 5.4/10.

Coven established Borchardt as an amateur filmmaker. American Movie helped Mark get noticed by a broader audience, which led to appearances (along with co-producer Mike Schank) in television programs such as Family Guy and Greg the Bunny, in which they parody scenes from the movie.

References

External links

American horror short films
1997 short films
American supernatural horror films
1997 films
Films about witchcraft
1990s English-language films
1990s American films